Zerynthus was a town of the Apsynthii in Thrace which had a temple of Apollo and Artemis. Because of that two deities derived the epithet of Zerynthian.

According to Lycophron's Alexandra, this was the location of Zerynthos or Zirynthia, a cave sacred to Hecate.

References 

Populated places in ancient Thrace